Phantom Valley is a 1948 American Western film directed by Ray Nazarro and written by J. Benton Cheney. The film stars Charles Starrett, Virginia Hunter, Ozie Waters and Smiley Burnette. The film was released on February 19, 1948, by Columbia Pictures.

Plot

Cast          
Charles Starrett as Steve Collins / The Durango Kid
Virginia Hunter as Janice Littlejohn
Ozie Waters as Ozie Waters
Smiley Burnette as Smiley Burnette
Joel Friedkin as Sam Littlejohn
Robert Filmer as Bob Reynolds
Mikel Conrad as Crag Parker
Zon Murray as Frazer
Sam Flint as Jim Durant
Fred F. Sears as Ben Thiebold
Teddy Infuhr as Chips
Jerry Jerome as Bart

References

External links
 

1948 films
1940s English-language films
American Western (genre) films
1948 Western (genre) films
Columbia Pictures films
Films directed by Ray Nazarro
American black-and-white films
1940s American films